Bombay Blue may refer to:

Bombay Blue, a 1997 British television series directed by Roger Tucker
Bombay Blue, a brand name for a variety of synthetic cannabis